The Heath GAA is a Gaelic football, ladies' Gaelic football and rounders club in County Laois, Ireland, located to the northeast of Portlaoise.

History
The club was founded in 1888. Originally the club was known as St. Patrick's. The club colours were scarlet and grey but nowadays they are black and amber.

The Heath have won 10 Laois Senior Football Championship titles, the last of which came in 1993.

Denis Lalor (who not only starred on the Laois Senior team but also won two Railway Cup medals with Leinster), Pat Roe and Chris Bergin are among The Heath's most famous players in recent times while Shane Hennessy, David O'Hara, Michael Clancy and Michael Lambe have all achieved the dream of playing in an All-Ireland Minor Football Championship Final.

Because The Heath is a football only club, a number of its players play hurling with Clonad or Park/Ratheniska.

Achievements
 Laois Senior Football Championship: (10) 1913, 1918, 1920, 1957, 1958, 1960, 1961, 1962, 1974, 1993
 Laois Intermediate Football Championship: (4) 1943, 1953, 1986, 2022
 Laois Junior Football Championships: (6) 1914, 1930, 1949, 1985, 1990, 2009
 Laois Junior B Football Championship: (2) 1988, 1997
 Laois Junior C Football Championship: (1) 2010
 Laois Minor Football Championship: (2) 1994, 2005 (both with players from Park–Ratheniska)
 Laois Minor B Football Championship: (4) 1988, 2002, 2004, 2017 
 Laois All-County Football League Div. 1: (2) 1976, 2016
 Laois All-County Football League Div. 2: (1) 2014
 Laois All-County Football League Div. 3: (2) 2004, 2009
 Laois All-County Football League Div. 5: (1) 2012

Notable players
Daithí Carroll
Sue Ramsbottom (ladies' football)

References

External links
 Laoistalk - Laois GAA News Website

Gaelic games clubs in County Laois
Gaelic football clubs in County Laois